The Seabed Arms Control Treaty (or Seabed Treaty, formally the Treaty on the Prohibition of the Emplacement of Nuclear Weapons and Other Weapons of Mass Destruction on the Sea-Bed and the Ocean Floor and in the Subsoil thereof) is a multilateral agreement between the United States, Soviet Union (now Russia), United Kingdom, and 91 other countries banning the emplacement of nuclear weapons or "weapons of mass destruction" on the ocean floor beyond a 12-mile (22.2 km) coastal zone. It allows signatories to observe all seabed "activities" of any other signatory beyond the 12-mile zone to ensure compliance.

Like the Antarctic Treaty, the Outer Space Treaty, and the Nuclear-Weapon-Free Zone treaties, the Seabed Arms Control Treaty sought to prevent the introduction of international conflict and nuclear weapons into an area hitherto free of them. Reaching agreement on the seabed, however, involved problems not met in framing the other two agreements.

History
In the 1960s, advances in the technology of oceanography and greatly increased interest in the vast and virtually untapped resources of the ocean floor led to concern that the absence of clearly established rules of law might lead to strife. And there were concurrent fears that nations might use the seabed as a new environment for military installations, including those capable of launching nuclear weapons.

In keeping with a proposal submitted to the U.N. Secretary General by Ambassador Pardo of Malta in August 1967, the U.N. General Assembly, on 18 December 1967, established an ad hoc committee to study ways of reserving the seabed for peaceful purposes, with the objective of ensuring "that the exploration and use of the seabed and the ocean floor should be conducted in accordance with the principles and purposes of the Charter of the United Nations, in the interests of maintaining international peace and security and for the benefit of all mankind." The Committee was given permanent status the following year. At the same time, seabed-related military and arms control issues were referred to the Eighteen Nation Committee on Disarmament (ENDC) and its successor, the Conference of the Committee on Disarmament (CCD). In a message of 18 March 1969, President Nixon said the American delegation to the ENDC should seek discussion of the factors necessary for an international agreement prohibiting the emplacement of weapons of mass destruction on the seabed and ocean floor and pointed out that an agreement of this kind would, like the Antarctic and Outer Space treaties, "prevent an arms race before it has a chance to start."

Status

List of parties
The Seabed Arms Control Treaty was opened for signature in Washington, London, and Moscow on 11 February 1971. It entered into force 18 May 1972, when the United States, the United Kingdom, the Soviet Union, and more than 22 nations had deposited instruments of ratification.  As of October 2018, 94 current states are parties to the treaty, while another 21 have signed the treaty but have not completed ratification.

Multiple dates indicate the different days in which states submitted their signature or deposition, which varied by location.  This location is noted by: (L) for London, (M) for Moscow, and (W) for Washington.

Notes

State with limited recognition, abiding by treaty
When the PRC subsequently ratified the treaty, they described the ROC's ratification as "illegal". The ROC has committed itself to continue to adhere to the requirements of the treaty, and the United States has declared that they still consider them to be "bound by its obligations".

States that have signed but not ratified

States that have not signed and ratified

See also 
 International Seabed Authority

References

External links 

 Text of the treaty
 Seabed Arms Control Treaty, Federation of American Scientists
 Treaty on the Prohibition of the Emplacement of Nuclear Weapons and other Weapons of Mass Destruction on the Sea-Bed and the Ocean Floor and in the Subsoil Thereof, United States Department of State
 Signatories and ratifications list

1972 in the environment
Cold War treaties
Law of the sea treaties
Treaties of the United States
Treaties of the Soviet Union
Treaties concluded in 1971
Treaties entered into force in 1972
Treaties establishing nuclear-weapon-free zones
Treaties of the United Kingdom
Arms control treaties
1971 in international relations
Treaties of the Kingdom of Afghanistan
Treaties of Algeria
Treaties of Antigua and Barbuda
Treaties of Argentina
Treaties of Australia
Treaties of Austria
Treaties of the Bahamas
Treaties of Belgium
Treaties of the People's Republic of Benin
Treaties of Botswana
Treaties of Brazil
Treaties of the People's Republic of Bulgaria
Treaties of the Byelorussian Soviet Socialist Republic
Treaties of Canada
Treaties of the Central African Republic
Treaties of Taiwan
Treaties of the People's Republic of China
Treaties of the Republic of the Congo
Treaties of Ivory Coast
Treaties of Croatia
Treaties of Cyprus
Treaties of Cuba
Treaties of Czechoslovakia
Treaties of the Czech Republic
Treaties of Denmark
Treaties of the Dominican Republic
Treaties of the Derg
Treaties of Finland
Treaties of East Germany
Treaties of West Germany
Treaties of Ghana
Treaties of Greece
Treaties of Guinea-Bissau
Treaties of the Hungarian People's Republic
Treaties of India
Treaties of Pahlavi Iran
Treaties of Ba'athist Iraq
Treaties of Ireland
Treaties of Italy
Treaties of Jamaica
Treaties of Japan
Treaties of Jordan
Treaties of South Korea
Treaties of the Kingdom of Laos
Treaties of Latvia
Treaties of Lesotho
Treaties of Liechtenstein
Treaties of Luxembourg
Treaties of Malaysia
Treaties of Malta
Treaties of Mauritius
Treaties of Mexico
Treaties of the Mongolian People's Republic
Treaties of Morocco
Treaties of Nepal
Treaties of the Netherlands
Treaties of New Zealand
Treaties of Nicaragua
Treaties of Niger
Treaties of Norway
Treaties of Panama
Treaties of the Philippines
Treaties of the Polish People's Republic
Treaties of Portugal
Treaties of Qatar
Treaties of the Socialist Republic of Romania
Treaties of Rwanda
Treaties of Saint Kitts and Nevis
Treaties of Saint Lucia
Treaties of Saint Vincent and the Grenadines
Treaties of São Tomé and Príncipe
Treaties of Saudi Arabia
Treaties of Serbia and Montenegro
Treaties of Seychelles
Treaties of Singapore
Treaties of Slovenia
Treaties of Slovakia
Treaties of the Solomon Islands
Treaties of South Africa
Treaties of Spain
Treaties of Eswatini
Treaties of Sweden
Treaties of Switzerland
Treaties of Togo
Treaties of Tunisia
Treaties of Turkey
Treaties of the Ukrainian Soviet Socialist Republic
Treaties of Vietnam
Treaties of South Yemen
Treaties of Yugoslavia
Treaties of Zambia
Nuclear technology treaties
Treaties extended to Greenland
Treaties extended to the Faroe Islands
Treaties extended to Aruba
Treaties extended to the Netherlands Antilles
Treaties extended to Saint Christopher-Nevis-Anguilla
Treaties extended to Bermuda
Treaties extended to the British Virgin Islands
Treaties extended to the Cayman Islands
Treaties extended to the Falkland Islands
Treaties extended to Gibraltar
Treaties extended to Montserrat
Treaties extended to the Pitcairn Islands
Treaties extended to Saint Helena, Ascension and Tristan da Cunha
Treaties extended to South Georgia and the South Sandwich Islands
Treaties extended to the Turks and Caicos Islands